Solvi Stubing (19 January 1941 – 3 July 2017) was a German actress and TV personality, mainly active in Italy.

Born in Berlin, Stubing obtained wide popularity in Italy with a commercial for Peroni Beer, and starred in many films, often of modest value, in several genres of Italian cinema.  For many years, between the 1980s and the 1990s, she hosted a number of television programs about cinema.

Stubing died on 3 July 2017 in Rome, age 76.

Partial filmography

 Le sette vipere (Il marito latino) (1964) - Inge
 Sheriff Won't Shoot (1965) - Rita, Orphan of the Sheriff
 I Knew Her Well (1965) - Susan - the foreign girl
 Made in Italy (1965) - Hostess
 Weekend, Italian Style (1965) - Miss Marini
 Me, Me, Me... and the Others (1966) - Passenger (uncredited)
 Secret Agent Super Dragon (1966) - Elizabeth
 Due mafiosi contro Al Capone (1966) - Ragazza del Night Club
 How We Robbed the Bank of Italy (1966) - Selma
 The Battle of the Mods (1966) - Diana
 Treasure of San Gennaro (1966) - The Nun
 Tiffany Memorandum (1967) - Hotel Maid
 Heißer Sand auf Sylt (1968)
 Oswalt Kolle: Das Wunder der Liebe II – Sexuelle Partnerschaft (1968) - Petra
 The Young Tigers of Hong Kong (1969)
 Heintje: A Heart Goes on a Journey (1969) - Gerdi Weber
 Garringo (1969) - Julie
 Ich spüre deine Haut (1969) - Marion
 Die liebestollen Baronessen (1970) - Baroness Sylvia
 Pussycat, Pussycat, I Love You (1970) - Girl with door
 The Adventures of Gerard (1970) - (uncredited)
 Atemlos vor Liebe (1970) - Fritzi
 Blindman (1971) - Bride
 Le Amazzoni - Donne d'amore e di guerra (1973) - Sinade
 Strip Nude for Your Killer (1975) - Patrizia
 Deported Women of the SS Special Section (1976) - Fräulein Greta
 Brothers Till We Die (1978) - Marika Engver - embassy clerk
 Traffic Jam (1979) - Blonde Model
 Liebeskonzil (1982) - Heloise
 Delitti (1987) - Harriet Anderson
 Il punto rosso (2006) - Dott.ssa Tagliavia

References

External links 

 

1941 births
2017 deaths
German film actresses
Actresses from Berlin
German television presenters
20th-century German actresses
German emigrants to Italy
German women television presenters